There are about 240 known moth species of the Central African Republic. The moths (mostly nocturnal) and butterflies (mostly diurnal) together make up the taxonomic order Lepidoptera.

This is a list of moth species which have been recorded in the Central African Republic.

Anomoeotidae
Staphylinochrous euryperalis Hampson, 1910

Arctiidae
Alpenus maculosa (Stoll, 1781)
Alpenus nigropunctata (Bethune-Baker, 1908)
Alpenus thomasi Watson, 1988
Amerila atrivena (Hampson, 1907)
Amsacta latimarginalis Rothschild, 1933
Balacra nigripennis (Aurivillius, 1904)
Creatonotos leucanioides Holland, 1893
Cyana rufeola Karisch & Dall'Asta, 2010
Spilosoma jordani Debauche, 1938
Spilosoma togoensis Bartel, 1903

Autostichidae
Neospastus ubangi Gozmány, 1966

Drepanidae
Callidrepana macnultyi Watson, 1965
Callidrepana serena Watson, 1965
Epicampoptera andersoni (Tams, 1925)
Epicampoptera marantica (Tams, 1930)
Epicampoptera strandi Bryk, 1913
Isospidia angustipennis (Warren, 1904)
Negera natalensis (Felder, 1874)
Spidia rufinota Watson, 1965
Uranometra oculata (Holland, 1893)

Eupterotidae
Phiala pseudatomaria Strand, 1911
Stenoglene brunneofasciata Dall'Asta & Poncin, 1980
Stenoglene citrinus (Druce, 1886)
Stenoglene dehanicus (Strand, 1911)
Stenoglene plagiatus (Aurivillius, 1911)
Stenoglene preussi (Aurivillius, 1893)
Stenoglene pujoli Dall'Asta & Poncin, 1980
Stenoglene sulphureotinctus Strand, 1912
Stenoglene thelda (Druce, 1887)
Stenoglene uelei Dall'Asta & Poncin, 1980
Stenoglene uniformis Dall'Asta & Poncin, 1980

Geometridae
Cleora rostella D. S. Fletcher, 1967
Colocleora linearis Herbulot, 1985
Miantochora picturata Herbulot, 1985
Miantochora subcaudata Herbulot, 1981
Racotis squalida (Butler, 1878)
Racotis zebrina Warren, 1899
Zamarada adumbrata D. S. Fletcher, 1974
Zamarada auratisquama Warren, 1897
Zamarada bicuspida D. S. Fletcher, 1974
Zamarada corroborata Herbulot, 1954
Zamarada cydippe Herbulot, 1954
Zamarada dentigera Warren, 1909
Zamarada differens Bastelberger, 1907
Zamarada dilata D. S. Fletcher, 1974
Zamarada dolorosa D. S. Fletcher, 1974
Zamarada enippe Prout, 1921
Zamarada excavata Bethune-Baker, 1913
Zamarada latimargo Warren, 1897
Zamarada melpomene Oberthür, 1912
Zamarada modesta Herbulot, 1985
Zamarada nasuta Warren, 1897
Zamarada protrusa Warren, 1897

Gracillariidae
Stomphastis thraustica (Meyrick, 1908)

Himantopteridae
Pedoptila ubangiana Schultze, 1931

Lasiocampidae
Cheligium ufo Zolotuhin & Gurkovich, 2009
Filiola dogma Zolotuhin & Gurkovich, 2009
Muzunguja rectilineata (Aurivillius, 1900)
Odontocheilopteryx maculata Aurivillius, 1905
Odontocheilopteryx phoneus Hering, 1928
Pachytrina elygara Zolotuhin & Gurkovich, 2009

Lymantriidae
Dasychira pseudosatanas Hering, 1926
Dasychira scotina Hering, 1926
Dasychira taberna Hering, 1926
Dasychira torniplaga Hering, 1926
Laelia gigantea Hampson, 1910
Laelia pluto (Hering, 1926)
Stracena promelaena (Holland, 1893)

Metarbelidae
Haberlandia annetteae Lehmann, 2011
Haberlandia odzalaensis Lehmann, 2011
Moyencharia mineti Lehmann, 2013
Moyencharia winteri Lehmann, 2013

Noctuidae
Achaea rothkirchi (Strand, 1914)
Acontia citrelinea Bethune-Baker, 1911
Aegocera rectilinea Boisduval, 1836
Masalia flavistrigata (Hampson, 1903)
Masalia galatheae (Wallengren, 1856)
Masalia rubristria (Hampson, 1903)
Mitrophrys menete (Cramer, 1775)
Thiacidas schausi (Hampson, 1905)

Notodontidae
Atrasana pujoli Kiriakoff, 1964

Psychidae
Eumeta rotunda Bourgogne, 1965

Saturniidae
Gonimbrasia alcestris (Weymer, 1907)
Ludia orinoptena Karsch, 1892
Melanocera pujoli Lemaire & Rougeot, 1974
Micragone agathylla (Westwood, 1849)
Nudaurelia eblis Strecker, 1876

Sphingidae
Acanthosphinx guessfeldti (Dewitz, 1879)
Acherontia atropos (Linnaeus, 1758)
Afrosataspes galleyi (Basquin, 1982)
Andriasa contraria Walker, 1856
Antinephele achlora Holland, 1893
Antinephele camerounensis Clark, 1937
Antinephele maculifera Holland, 1889
Antinephele marcida Holland, 1893
Atemnora westermannii (Boisduval, 1875)
Basiothia charis (Boisduval, 1875)
Basiothia medea (Fabricius, 1781)
Centroctena rutherfordi (Druce, 1882)
Cephonodes hylas (Linnaeus, 1771)
Ceridia heuglini (C. & R. Felder, 1874)
Chloroclanis virescens (Butler, 1882)
Coelonia fulvinotata (Butler, 1875)
Daphnis nerii (Linnaeus, 1758)
Euchloron megaera (Linnaeus, 1758)
Falcatula cymatodes (Rothschild & Jordan, 1912)
Falcatula falcata (Rothschild & Jordan, 1903)
Hippotion aporodes Rothschild & Jordan, 1912
Hippotion balsaminae (Walker, 1856)
Hippotion celerio (Linnaeus, 1758)
Hippotion eson (Cramer, 1779)
Hippotion irregularis (Walker, 1856)
Hippotion osiris (Dalman, 1823)
Hypaedalea butleri Rothschild, 1894
Leucophlebia afra Karsch, 1891
Leucostrophus commasiae (Walker, 1856)
Lophostethus dumolinii (Angas, 1849)
Lycosphingia hamatus (Dewitz, 1879)
Macroglossum trochilus (Hübner, 1823)
Macropoliana natalensis (Butler, 1875)
Neopolyptychus centralis Basquin & Pierre, 2005
Neopolyptychus consimilis (Rothschild & Jordan, 1903)
Neopolyptychus prionites (Rothschild & Jordan, 1916)
Neopolyptychus serrator (Jordan, 1929)
Nephele accentifera (Palisot de Beauvois, 1821)
Nephele aequivalens (Walker, 1856)
Nephele bipartita Butler, 1878
Nephele comma Hopffer, 1857
Nephele discifera Karsch, 1891
Nephele funebris (Fabricius, 1793)
Nephele maculosa Rothschild & Jordan, 1903
Nephele oenopion (Hübner, [1824])
Nephele peneus (Cramer, 1776)
Nephele rectangulata Rothschild, 1895
Nephele rosae Butler, 1875
Pantophaea jordani (Joicey & Talbot, 1916)
Phylloxiphia bicolor (Rothschild, 1894)
Phylloxiphia formosa (Schultze, 1914)
Phylloxiphia goodii (Holland, 1889)
Phylloxiphia illustris (Rothschild & Jordan, 1906)
Phylloxiphia oberthueri (Rothschild & Jordan, 1903)
Phylloxiphia oweni (Carcasson, 1968)
Phylloxiphia vicina (Rothschild & Jordan, 1915)
Platysphinx constrigilis (Walker, 1869)
Platysphinx phyllis Rothschild & Jordan, 1903
Platysphinx stigmatica (Mabille, 1878)
Platysphinx vicaria Jordan, 1920
Poliana buchholzi (Plötz, 1880)
Polyptychoides digitatus (Karsch, 1891)
Polyptychus affinis Rothschild & Jordan, 1903
Polyptychus andosa Walker, 1856
Polyptychus anochus Rothschild & Jordan, 1906
Polyptychus bernardii Rougeot, 1966
Polyptychus carteri (Butler, 1882)
Polyptychus coryndoni Rothschild & Jordan, 1903
Polyptychus enodia (Holland, 1889)
Polyptychus herbuloti Darge, 1990
Polyptychus hollandi Rothschild & Jordan, 1903
Polyptychus murinus Rothschild, 1904
Polyptychus orthographus Rothschild & Jordan, 1903
Polyptychus paupercula (Holland, 1889)
Polyptychus thihongae Bernardi, 1970
Polyptychus trisecta (Aurivillius, 1901)
Pseudenyo benitensis Holland, 1889
Pseudoclanis admatha Pierre, 1985
Pseudoclanis molitor (Rothschild & Jordan, 1912)
Pseudoclanis occidentalis Rothschild & Jordan, 1903
Pseudoclanis rhadamistus (Fabricius, 1781)
Rhadinopasa hornimani (Druce, 1880)
Rufoclanis rosea (Druce, 1882)
Temnora camerounensis Clark, 1923
Temnora crenulata (Holland, 1893)
Temnora curtula Rothschild & Jordan, 1908
Temnora elegans (Rothschild, 1895)
Temnora elisabethae Hering, 1930
Temnora eranga (Holland, 1889)
Temnora fumosa (Walker, 1856)
Temnora funebris (Holland, 1893)
Temnora griseata Rothschild & Jordan, 1903
Temnora iapygoides (Holland, 1889)
Temnora livida (Holland, 1889)
Temnora radiata (Karsch, 1892)
Temnora sardanus (Walker, 1856)
Temnora scitula (Holland, 1889)
Temnora spiritus (Holland, 1893)
Temnora stevensi Rothschild & Jordan, 1903
Temnora wollastoni Rothschild & Jordan, 1908
Theretra jugurtha (Boisduval, 1875)
Theretra orpheus (Herrich-Schäffer, 1854)
Theretra perkeo Rothschild & Jordan, 1903
Xanthopan morganii (Walker, 1856)

Tineidae
Acridotarsa melipecta (Meyrick, 1915)
Ceratophaga vastellus (Zeller, 1852)
Cubitofusa pseudoglebata (Gozmány, 1967)
Ectabola protracta Gozmány, 1966
Hapsifera refalcata Gozmány, 1967
Hyperbola primoti Gozmány, 1966
Hyperbola zicsii Gozmány, 1965
Miramonopis viettei Gozmány, 1966
Monopis addenda Gozmány, 1965
Monopis immaculata Gozmány, 1967
Monopis meyricki Gozmány, 1967
Monopis rejectella (Walker, 1864)
Nannotinea simplex Gozmány, 1966
Pachypsaltis morosa Gozmány, 1966
Perissomastix breviberbis (Meyrick, 1933)
Perissomastix idolatrix Gozmány & Vári, 1973
Perissomastix onyx Gozmány, 1966
Phereoeca postulata Gozmány, 1967
Pitharcha latriodes (Meyrick, 1917)
Setomorpha rutella Zeller, 1852
Sphallestasis truncata (Gozmány, 1966)
Syncalipsis optania (Meyrick, 1908)
Trichophaga abruptella (Wollaston, 1858)

Zygaenidae
Saliunca meruana Aurivillius, 1910

References

External links 

Moths
Moths
Central African Republic
Central African Republic